Harcharan Singh may refer to:

Harcharan Singh Brar (1922–2009), ex-chief minister of Punjab, India
Hercharn Singh (born 1986), first Sikh officer to be commissioned in the Pakistan Army
Harcharan Singh (cricketer) (1938-2019), Indian cricketer
Harcharan Singh (field hockey) (born 1950), Indian field hockey player
Harcharan Singh (writer) (1914–2006), Punjabi dramatist and writer